Nadine Rena Caron FACS, FRCSC, (born 1970), is a Canadian surgeon. She is the first Canadian female general surgeon of First Nations descent (Ojibway), as well as the first female First Nations student to graduate from University of British Columbia's medical school.

Early life and education
Dr. Caron was born in Kamloops, British Columbia, to an Ojibwe mother and an Italian immigrant father. Her mother was a teacher and her father was a mason. She is an Anishnawbe from Sagamok Anishnawbek First Nation. 

After growing up in Kamloops, she completed her BSc in Kinesiology at Simon Fraser University in 1993, where she was also a star basketball player and the winner of numerous awards, including the Shrum Gold Medal, awarded to the top undergraduate student. While completing her MD at the UBC Faculty of Medicine, Caron was again recognized as being the top ranked student. Caron also completed an MA in Public Health from Harvard University, while completing her surgical residency, as well as a postgraduate fellowship at the University of California, San Francisco, focused on endocrine surgical oncology. In June 2017, she received an honorary Doctorate of Laws from the University of the Fraser Valley. In October 2019, she received an honorary degree from Simon Fraser University.

Career
Dr. Caron works as a general and endocrine surgeon at Prince George Regional Hospital. She is an Associate Professor in the Department of Surgery, UBC Faculty of Medicine, and was appointed Co-Director of UBC's Centre for Excellence in Indigenous Health in 2014. She received the 2016 Dr. Thomas Dignan Indigenous Health Award from the Royal College of Physicians and Surgeons of Canada. Caron was rewarded for public health studies concerning Rural and First Nations populations. Caron leads the Northern Biobank Project, which will improve patients' access to participate in personalized medicine research in northern British Columbia. Caron currently works as an associate faculty member at Johns Hopkins Bloomberg School of Public Health.

Dr. Caron has served on several committees, including the Native Physicians Association of Canada, the British Columbia's Medical Association's Committee on Health Promotion, and the Ministry of Health's Advisory Committee on Provincial Health Goals. 

Dr. Caron was appointed the inaugural First Nations Health Authority (FNHA) Chair in Cancer and Wellness at the University of British Columbia in 2020. She helped found UBC's Centre for Excellence in Indigenous Health with Martin Schechter. 

She is an adjunct professor at the University of Northern British Columbia, associate faculty at the University of British Columbia's School of Population and Public Health, and a BC Cancer Agency scientist at the Genome Sciences Centre.

Select publications

Honours and awards 

 Shrum Gold Medal, top undergraduate student, Simon Fraser University, 1993
 Awards received from the University of British Columbia, Faculty of Medicine, 1997:
 Hamber Medal
 Dr. Jay C. Cheng Memorial Education Foundation Prize
 Dr. Jack Margulius Memorial Prize
 Top graduating student in Medicine, MD degree, and best cumulative record in all years of study
 Dr. John Big Canoe Memorial Scholarship, Canadian Medical Association, 1997
 "100 Canadians to Watch," Maclean's Magazine, 1997
 Outstanding Alumni Award, Simon Fraser University, 2011
 Dr. Thomas Dignan Indigenous Health Award, Royal College of Physicians and Surgeons of Canada, 2016
 "Women of the year: 12 Canadians who rocked 2016," Chatelaine Magazine
 Honourary Doctor of Science, Simon Fraser University, 2016
 Wallace Wilson Leadership Award, University of British Columbia Medical Alumni Association, 2017
 Honourary Doctor of Laws, University of the Fraser Valley, 2017
 Athletic Hall of Fame, Terry Fox Humanitarian Category, Simon Fraser University, 2019
 Inclusive Excellence Prize, Canadian Cancer Society, 2020
 Member of the Order of BC, 2022

Indigenous health and Canadian health policy research 
Dr. Caron's research focuses on Indigenous health and Canadian health policy. She has made several important discoveries regarding health inequities in Canada, including the discovery that First Nations in British Columbia have higher rates of some cancers, and lower survival rates of almost all cancers, compared to non-First Nations in B.C. She also instigated a study that discovered that Indigenous peoples are 30% more likely to die after surgery than non-Indigenous peoples.

References

External links 
 

1970 births
Living people
People from Kamloops
Ojibwe people
Canadian people of Italian descent
Simon Fraser University alumni
University of British Columbia Faculty of Medicine alumni
Harvard School of Public Health alumni
Academic staff of the University of British Columbia Faculty of Medicine
Johns Hopkins Bloomberg School of Public Health faculty
21st-century Canadian physicians
Canadian surgeons
Canadian women physicians
21st-century women physicians
Fellows of the American College of Surgeons
First Nations academics
Women surgeons
21st-century surgeons
Canadian women academics
First Nations women